Natal Indian Congress (NIC) was an organisation that aimed to fight discrimination against Indians in South Africa.

The Natal Indian Congress was proposed by Mahatma Gandhi on 22 May 1894. established  on 22 August 1894.

Gandhi was the Honorary Secretary and Abdoola Hajee Adam Jhaveri (Dada Abdulla) was elected president.

The Vice-Presidents were: Hajee Mahomed Hajee Dada, Abdool Kadir, Hajee Dada Hajee Habib, Moosa Hajee Adam, P. Dawjee Mahomed, Peeran Mahomed, Murugesa Pillay, Ramaswami Naidoo, Hoosen Miran, Adamjee Miankhan, K. R. Nayanah, Amod Bayat (P. M. Burg), Moosa Hajee Cassim, Mahomed Cassim Jeeva, Parsee Rustomjee, Dawad Mahomed, Hoosen Cassim Amod Tili, Doraiswamy Pillay, Omar Hajee Aba, Osmankhan Rahamatkhan, Rangaswami Padayachi, Hajee Mahomed (P. M. Burg), Camroodeen (P. M. Burg).

The Members of the Committee included: The Vice-Presidents and Messrs M. D. Joshi, Narsiram, Manekji, Dowjee Mammuji Mutalah, Muthu Krishna, Bissessar, Goolam Hoosen Randeri, Shamshoodeen, G. A. Bassa, Sarabjit, L. Gabriel, James Christopher, Sooboo Naidu, John Gabriel, Suleiman Voraji, Cassimjee Amoojee, R. Kundaswamy Naidu, M. E. Kathrada, Ibrahim M. Khatri, Shaik Farid, Varind Ismail, Ranjit, Perumal Naidoo, Parsee Dhanjisha, Royappan, Joosub Abdool Carim, Arjun Singh, Ismail Kadir, Easop Kadua, Mahomed Esak, Mahomed Hafejee, A. M. Paruck, Suleiman Dawjee, V. Narayana Pather, Lutchman Panday, Osman Ahmed & Mahomed Tayub.

During its formative years, the NIC introduced many early petitions for changes to proposed discriminatory legislations.

In the 1960s, the organisation become inactive due to the growing state repression and the ban of its leaders.

It later allied itself with the African National Congress.

See also 
South African Indian Congress

References 
Constitution of the Natal Indian Congress-1894
The Collected Works of Mahatma Gandhi

Notes and references 

Anti-Apartheid organisations
Anti-racism in South Africa
Indian diaspora in South Africa
Organizations established in 1894
Defunct civic and political organisations in South Africa
1894 establishments in the Colony of Natal
Mahatma Gandhi